Sadik Kaceli (14 March 1914 – 24 December 2000) was an Albanian artist. He studied in Paris at the École nationale supérieure des Beaux-Arts (1936–1941).
Kaceli is one of Albania's best known painters, receiving many decorations as People's Artist of Albania and the Honour Citizen of Tirana medal. He created the first series of the Albanian lek. In 2016 Sadik Kaceli was given the  Honour of Nation Order. He is one of the founders of the National Art Gallery of Albania, designed the first version of the Albanian lek, and made the People's Republic of Albania Coat of Arms.

Biography
Kaceli attended the Harry T. Fultz Technical school from 1929, and began a drawing course in 1931.

He was the brother of Jonuz Kaceli, a well-known businessman and dissident of the Communist Regime in Albania. Fadil Kaceli, is also a brother of Sadik. His son, Buron Kaceli, is also a painter and former politician, deputy in Parliament of Albania, Vice Mayor of Albania's capital, Tirana, and the countries Director of Culture.

A monografi of Sadik Kaceli was released in 2008 and translated into English in 2009. It contains the story of his life, works, unpublished notes, admiration and gratitude. A street in Tirana is named after Kaceli. He died on 24 December 2000.

Gallery

References

Bibliography

External links

Socialist Albania since 1944: domestic and foreign developments, Volume 23
Albania today
Albania through art
The Harriman review, Volume 9, Columbia University, Harriman Institute, 1996

Date of death missing
1914 births
2000 deaths
20th-century Albanian painters
Albanian expatriates in France
Albanian sculptors
People from Tirana
People's Artists of Albania
20th-century Albanian sculptors